Danilo Petrović (born May 10, 1999) is a Serbian professional basketball player who currently plays for Forlì 2.015 of the Italian 2nd-tier level Serie A2 Basket.

Early career 
His first basketball steps was in KK Vili and the Hemofarm-Stada, later he played for young team of the Crvena zvezda. He played the Euroleague Basketball Next Generation Tournaments for the Segafredo Virtus Bologna U18 team (2014–2016)

Professional career 
In 2015, Petrović made his senior basketball appearance for Virtus Bologna of the Serie A2 Basket.

In 2017, Petrović joined We're Basket Ortona of the Italian 3rd-tier Serie B. In 2018, he signed for Poderosa Basket Montegranaro of the Italian Serie A2.

On August 5, 2019, he has signed with Forlì 2.015 of the Italian 2nd-tier level Serie A2 Basket.

National team career 
Petrović was a member of the Serbian U-18 national basketball team that won the gold medal at the 2017 FIBA Europe Under-18 Championship. Over seven tournament games, he averaged 4 points, 1 rebounds and 0.6 assists per game.

References

External links 
 Profile at eurobasket.com
 Danilo Petrovic at realgm.com
 Danilo Petrovic at serbiahoop.com

1999 births
Living people
Virtus Bologna players
KK Crvena zvezda youth players
Serbian men's basketball players
Serbian expatriate basketball people in Italy
People from Vršac
Power forwards (basketball)